Jeneil Williams is a Jamaican fashion model.

Career 
Williams was discovered in a model search competition in Jamaica called Caribbean Model Search, in 2005; she subsequently signed with New York Models. In 2009, she appeared in a United Colors of Benetton campaign (with models including Constance Jablonski, Liu Wen, Simon Nessman, and Tao Okamoto) which led to Vogue editor-in-chief Anna Wintour requesting her for a photoshoot with photographer Mario Testino. She appeared in the July 2008 "all black issue" of Vogue Italia, featuring only black models. She has walked for Jonathan Saunders, Emanuel Ungaro, Loewe, Altuzarra, Balenciaga, Calvin Klein, Yeezy, Kenzo, Y-3, Fendi, Vivienne Westwood, John Galliano, Acne Studios, Zac Posen, Louis Vuitton, Reed Krakoff, Opening Ceremony, Lanvin, Catherine Malandrino, Carolina Herrera, L'Wren Scott, DVF. In 2010, with Gisele Bündchen and Miranda Kerr, Williams appeared in a triple cover series for i-D magazine. She has also modeled for Topshop, L'Oréal, Tom Ford Beauty, Nike, Inc., H&M, Gap, Inc., Coca-Cola, Jean Paul Gaultier, Jimmy Choo, Sephora, and Balenciaga.

Personal life 
Williams is expecting her first child, a daughter, in 2020. During her pregnancy she modelled for Nike's first maternity line. Her child was born in autumn 2020.

References 

Living people
Year of birth missing (living people)
IMG Models models
Jamaican expatriates in the United States
Jamaican female models
People from Kingston, Jamaica
Select Model Management models